A Low Hum is the ongoing project founded by photographer and music impresario Blink (born Ian Jorgensen), and is based in Wellington, New Zealand. Under the umbrella A LOW HUM, Blink organises tours, releases records, makes music videos, organises one-off events/festivals and publishes magazines and books. As of 2009, A Low Hum has organised and supported tours for over seventy musical acts from New Zealand, United States, Australia and beyond.

In 2006, tours occurred every month and comprised between two and four rising Kiwi bands who played venues and gigs in about a dozen New Zealand locales along the way. In conjunction with each tour, A Low Hum published an A5 magazine, usually including a feature album or EP (often unreleased material by bands) and a music compilation CD with songs by local and international acts.

In 2006, A Low Hum also began publishing "Local Knowledge", a comprehensive guide for bands wanting to tour New Zealand and engage with the music industry.

In 2007, A Low Hum entered new territory as the producer of a major new live music festival, Camp A Low Hum (CALH), held on a large rural campsite close to Wainuiomata, 30 minutes drive north of Wellington. Attended by an intimate 350 campers, 49 bands performed 3, 4 and 5 February. In 2008 the festival spanned a total of four days featuring over 60 bands and doubling in audience numbers to around 700, according to Blink, the maximum capacity. The 2009 event sold out a month before the event, though capacity was limited to only 800 people. The 2010 event has been renamed Campus A Low Hum and has relocated to an unused agricultural college outside the town of Bulls in the North Island. Regarding changes to the format of the festival, Blink has said: I have retained everything that was special about the Camp A Low Hum philosophy: intimate performances, small crowds, multiple environments, renegade performances, no band announcements, multiple performances by bands, spontaneous party action – and taken it bak 2 skool and added a whole bunch of new concepts to make it a brand new experience.

In 2007, after having released music for a few years in conjunction with its magazine, A Low Hum ventured further into the territories of a traditional record label by starting a monthly subscription-based CDR singles club and releasing albums by local New Zealand artists, Disasteradio, Over the Atlantic and The Enright House.

In 2008, A Low Hum released a trilogy of free digital download EPs by up and coming NZ recordings artists; Secret Knives, Mount Pleasant and Red Steers

In 2009 Blink from A Low Hum tour managed Disasteradio around the World as well as worked on the next phase of his music festival series, renamed to Campus A Low Hum

In 2010 Blink is working on a documentary of the first three Camps, and is working on the follow-up to his 2006 book "Local Knowledge"
April 2010, As reported by the Creative Freedom Foundation, A Low Hum announced it has ditched CDs for future releases and is planning on mainly only releasing Mp3s with accompanying artwork.

In 2011, Blink released his follow-up to "Local Knowledge", titled "D.I.Y Touring the World". The print edition is sold out, but the digital edition is still available from the A Low Hum website.

In November 2011, A Low Hum organised and promoted the Flying Nun 30th Anniversary celebrations with 30 huge shows across the country in one month.

From 2012 to 2014 Blink ran Wellington live music venue "Puppies" which was on the corner of Tory and Vivian Streets.

In 2013, A Low Hum ran "Square Wave Festival", an electronic music festival featuring 70 artists playing 30 shows throughout New Zealand in 6 venues throughout November

In 2014 after closing Puppies, Blink, now returning to using his birth name released another book titled "The Problem with Music in New Zealand and How To Fix It and Why I started and ran Puppies", the book received widespread press in NZ and one of the essays bought about a response from APRA/AMCOS NZ who published their response on their website.

After eight such festivals, in 2014, A Low Hum finished Camp A Low Hum with a final event at Camp Wainui in Wainuiomata, Wellington

In 2015, A Low Hum published a box set of ten books of Ian's photographs of the New Zealand music scene over 15 years from 2000 to 2015, this was called A Movement, this box-set was released with a 25-date national release tour including a mini-festival.

In 2015, A Low Hum began working with Wellington inventor and engineer Rohan Hill and helped take his invention, The Deluge, successfully to an international audience.  Nominated in 2017 by MusicTech magazine for their "Best new drum machines and samplers" list. The Deluge is a portable synthesizer, sequencer and sampler used my musicians all over the world including notable acts such as Hans-Peter Lindstrøm whose use of the Deluge is his first time not using Ableton for his live sets.

In 2015, Calling on his experience, Ian began teaching events, touring and media at Massey University in Wellington as part of the Bachelor of Commercial Music program.

In 2015, A Low Hum toured Wellington based band Shocking Pinks around the world as well as re-releasing their debut album. While on tour A Low Hum made, along with Ash Smith, a 6-part web series called "D.I.Y Touring the World" for "The Wireless", a visual companion to the book he'd released years earlier. Ian was interviewed by Chinese blog Kiwiese while there with Shocking Pinks.

NYE 2014/2015, A Low Hum hosted a small two-day music festival at Crossing Backpackers in Ohakune called "A Low Hum House" A short-film edited and directed by Ian called "A Low Hum House" was released showing all the bands who played at the event.

In 2016, A Low Hum held a two-night 15-year anniversary party called "15 Years of A Low Hum", returning to Tatum Park in Levin over the NYE period.

In 2018, A Low Hum organised and promoted the "Where's My Room" national tour featuring Neil and Liam Finn.

According to a list on the A Low Hum website, as of February 2018, A Low Hum has promoted 560 events in New Zealand.

A LOW HUM Tours 
Bands whom Blink/A Low Hum have toured around NZ and the World:

 Degrees K & Ejector (September 2003)
 Batrider (April 2004)
 Ghostplane (May 2004)
 The Fanatics and Disasteradio (June 2004)
 Degrees K (July 2004)
 The Accelerants (August 2004)
 The Phoenix Foundation, Cassette, Phelps and Munro (October 2004)
 Cortina, Coolies, Disasteradio, Golden Axe (November 2004)
 Gerling (December 2004)
 Shocking Pinks, The Inkling (March 2005)
 Connan and the Mockasins, The Chandeliers, Hot Swiss Mistress (April 2005)
 Ghostplane, Mestar (August 2005)
 So So Modern, Teen Wolf (November 2005)
 Die! Die! Die!, French Horns, Yokel Ono, The Vacants (February 2006)
 Connan and the Mockasins, Whipping Cats, Gran Prix (March 2006)
 The Reduction Agents, Over the Atlantic, The Undercurrents (April 2006)
 Disasteradio, Kill Surf City, Voom (May 2006)
 The Sneaks, The Shaky Hands, Thought Creature (June 2006)
 Jakob, Operation Rolling Thunder, City City City (August 2006)
 So So Modern, Collapsing Cities, Alps, Frase+Bri (September 2006)
 The Ruby Suns, Odessa, The Bengal Lights (October 2006)
 Rock and Roll Machine, The Mysterious Tapeman, The Bloody Souls, Don Julio and the Hispanic Mechanic (November 2006)
 Ghosptlane, Signer, Phelps and Munro, Diasasteradio, Frase+Bri (December 2006)

 So So Modern, My Disco, Disasteradio, Frase+Bri (February 2007)
 The Evens (February 2007)
 So So Modern, Cut Off Your Hands (July 2007)
 Yacht, Panther (August 2007)
 The Enright House, Thought Creature, Little Pictures (band), Get Set Play (September 2007)
 Disasteradio (October 2007)
 Over the Atlantic (April–September 2008) – World Tour – US, England, Scotland, France, Germany, Luxembourg, Netherlands, Australia, New Zealand
 Disasteradio (April–September 2009) – World Tour – US, England, Scotland, France, Germany, Luxembourg, Netherlands, Spain, Czech Republic, Poland, Slovakia, Slovenia, Belgium, Austria, Australia, New Zealand
 Die! Die! Die! (July 2010)
 Disasteradio (World Tour, 2011)
 Aa (2012)
 Mt. Eerie (2013)
 The Dan Deacon Ensemble (2013)
 Kirin J Callinan (2013)
 Alba (Nov 2013)
 Oscar Key Sung (Nov 2013)
 Donny Benet (Nov 2013)
 Shocking Pinks, Mongo Skato, Secret Knives, Sarah Mary Chadwick, Borrowed Cassettes (March 2015)
 Shocking Pinks (Sept–Dec 2015) – World Tour – China, France, Germany, UK, Netherlands, Switzerland, US, Australia, New Zealand
 My Disco (Auckland, Wellington – Feb 2016)

 Neil and Liam Finn "Where's My Room" (2018), 17 shows throughout New Zealand

Camp A Low Hum

2007 – Brookfields Outdoor Education Centre, Wainuiomata. 3–5 Feb

2007 Line-up:

2008 – Tatum Park, Ohau. 2–5 Feb

2008 Official Line-up:

2009 – Homedale, 6–8 February

2009 Official Line-up:

2009 Renegade Room Line-up:

2012 – Homedale 

2012 Official Line-Up:

2012 Renegade Room Line-Up:

2013 – Homedale, Wainuiomata, 8–10 February 

2013 Official Line-Up

2013 Renegade Line-Up

2014 – Homedale, Wainuiomata

2014 Official Line-up:

Campus A Low Hum

2010 – Flock House, 23–25 Jan' 

2010 Official Lineup:

2011 Flock House, 11–13 Feb 

2011 Official Lineup:

Square Wave Festival 
A nationwide electronic city music festival. 35 shows took place in Auckland, Palmerston North, Wellington, Christchurch and Dunedin during November 2013.

2013 Official Line-up

A Low Hum NYE Parties

ALH NYE at Bodega, 31 Dec 2006

ALH NYE at Bodega, 31 Dec 2007

Fields of Dreams at Camp Wainui, 31 Dec 2009 & 1 Jan 2010

Big City Dreams, Garden Club, 31 Dec 2010

Fields of Dreams at Camp Wainui, 31 Dec 2011 & 1 Jan 2012

Puppies NYE, 31 Dec 2013

A Low Hum House at Erua Lodge, 31 Dec 2014 & 1 Jan 2015

Official Lineup 31 Dec

Official Lineup 1 Jan

ALHxNYExSEA at Boat Cafe, 31 Dec 2015
Official Line-up

15 Years of A Low Hum at Tatum Park, 30 & 31 Dec 2016
Official Line-up

A Low Hum Releases

References

External links 
 
 Interview with Blink
 A two-part history of A Low Hum on the Audioculture website, written by Gareth Shute
  Review of CALH2010 by Andy Hazel for Mess and Noise

Music festivals established in 2003
Rock festivals in New Zealand
Concert tours
Festivals in Wellington